Alt.music.hardcore is the tenth studio LP by hardcore punk band 7 Seconds. It is a compilation of the 1982 Skins, Brains, and Guts 7-inch EP, the 1983 Committed for Life 7-inch EP, and the 1985 Blast From the Past EP

Track listing 
 "Skins, Brains, and Guts" - 0:55
 "No Authority" – 0:51
 "Redneck Society" – 0:41
 "Baby Games" – 0:27
 "Racism Sucks" – 2:26
 "This Is My Life" – 1:08
 "Anti-Clan" – 1:06
 "I Hate Sports" – 0:41
 "We're Gonna Fight" – 2:31
 "5 Years of Lies" – 0:44
 "Drug Control" – 0:39
 "Bottomless Pit" – 1:32
 "Fight Your Own Fight" – 1:06
 "Committed for Life" – 1:25
 "This Is the Angry" – 1:06
 "Aggro" – 1:06
 "War in the Head" – 0:41
 "The Kids Are United" – 2:53

References

1995 albums
7 Seconds (band) albums